Attorney General Sherman may refer to:

Carl Sherman (1890–1956), Attorney General of New York
Edgar J. Sherman (1834–1914), Attorney General of Massachusetts

See also
General Sherman (disambiguation)